Botanique (French) or Kruidtuin (Dutch) is a Brussels Metro station on the northern segment of lines 2 and 6. It is located under the Small Ring (Brussels' inner ring road) at the Rue Royale/Koningsstraat in the municipality of the Saint-Josse-ten-Noode, north of the City of Brussels, Belgium. It opened as a premetro (underground tram) station on 18 August 1974 and became a full metro station on 2 October 1988.

The National Botanic Garden of Belgium, for which the area and station is named, was moved in the 1930s to the Flemish municipality of Meise, but the name Le Botanique and the building complex located nearby is still used as a concert venue and cultural centre.

External links

Brussels metro stations
Railway stations opened in 1974
Saint-Josse-ten-Noode